Christopher Robin Jones (17 June 1943 — 30 March 1986) was a British figure skater. He was a two-time British national champion and competed at the 1960 Winter Olympics, finishing 12th. He placed as high as sixth at the European Championships (1961).

Competitive highlights

References 

1943 births
1986 deaths
British male single skaters
Olympic figure skaters of Great Britain
Figure skaters at the 1960 Winter Olympics